Charlotte Patricia Louise Douglas (born 17 March 1987), known professionally as Scarlette Douglas, is an English television presenter, singer, dancer and television property expert. She is known for being one of presenters on the Channel 4 series A Place in the Sun between 2015 and 2022.

She has also been a regular guest reporter on The One Show, Points of View and Jeremy Vine. Since 2022, she has presented George Clarke's Flipping Fast and Worst House on the Street for Channel 4, alongside her brother, Stuart Douglas.

Life and career
Charlotte Patricia Louise Douglas was born on 17 March 1987 in Enfield, London. She has two older brothers, Stuart and Andrew, the former of whom is a retired professional footballer that played for Luton Town. Douglas began her career in musical theatre, appearing in various productions including Hairspray, Little Shop of Horrors and I Can't Sing!. She also worked as a backing singer and dancer on Thriller – Live and for Electro Velvet at the Eurovision Song Contest 2015.

In 2015, Douglas joined the Channel 4 lifestyle series A Place in the Sun as one of the presenters and property experts. She decided to leave the series in August 2022 after seven years to pursue other projects. In 2016, Douglas began appearing as a reporter on the BBC One series Points of View. Between 2017 and 2020, she appeared as a regular reporter on The One Show, as well as being as a guest presenter on the Channel 5 chat and debate show Jeremy Vine from 2019 to 2021. In 2020, Douglas presented Holiday Secrets… is Last Minute Best? on Channel 4. 

In July 2022, Douglas, alongside her brother Stuart, presented Love It or List It as part of Channel 4's "Black to Front" special. In June 2022, the pair began presenting architect George Clarke's series George Clarke's Flipping Fast. In August 2022, they began presenting the property development series Worst House on the Street. 

In November 2022, she took part in Series 22 of I'm a Celebrity...Get Me Out of Here! where she was the second celebrity to be voted out and the third to leave the camp.

In December 2022, she stood in for Richard Arnold as Good Morning Britain’s Entertainment presenter.

Filmography

References

External links 
 
 

1987 births
Black British television personalities
English female dancers
English television presenters
I'm a Celebrity...Get Me Out of Here! (British TV series) participants
Living people
People from Enfield, London
Television personalities from London
English people of Nigerian descent